Varkureh (also Romanized as Varkūreh; also known as Varkūrā) is a village in Shabkhus Lat Rural District, Rankuh District, Amlash County, Gilan Province, Iran. At the 2006 census, its population was 370, in 109 families.

References 

Populated places in Amlash County